Vaughn Antoine Parker (born June 5, 1971) is a former American football offensive tackle for the San Diego Chargers and Washington Redskins of the National Football League.   He played high school football at St. Joseph's Collegiate Institute in Buffalo, New York where he was named to the All-Western New York and All-Northeast teams. Parker played college football at the University of California, Los Angeles (UCLA), where he became only the second offensive player in school history to be named to the all-conference team three times.  Parker was drafted in the second round (63rd overall) of the 1994 NFL Draft by the Chargers.  His rookie year, the Chargers won the AFC Championship and faced San Francisco in Super Bowl XXIX.  Parker spent ten seasons playing for the Chargers, with his final season (2003) there cut short by a season-ending knee injury.  He signed with the Redskins for the 2004 season and appeared in one game before being waived at the conclusion of the season.

Vaughn successfully earned an Executive MBA through the University of Southern California in May 2017. In November 2017, Parker was officially recognized by his hometown for his sports achievements when he was inducted into the Greater Buffalo Sports Hall of Fame. He currently lives in San Diego, California.

References

External links
Vaughn Parker's page at NFL.com

1971 births
Living people
American football offensive linemen
San Diego Chargers players
St. Joseph's Collegiate Institute alumni
UCLA Bruins football players
Washington Redskins players